Gavin Gwynne (born 25 April 1990) is a Welsh professional boxer who has held the British lightweight title since 2022 and previously the Commonwealth lightweight title between 2021 and 2022.

Professional career
Gwynne made his professional debut on 23 July 2016, scoring a four-round points decision (PTS) victory against Joe Beeden at the Rhydycar Leisure Centre in Merthyr Tydfil, Wales.

After compiling a record of 7–0 (1 KO) he defeated Henry James on 15 December 2017 at the Merthyr Leisure Centre in Merthyr Tydfil, capturing the vacant Welsh Area lightweight title via PTS over ten rounds.

Two fights later he faced Myron Mills on 27 October 2018 at the Newport Centre in Newport, Wales. In a fight which served as a final eliminator for the British lightweight title, Gwynne defeated Mills via ten-round unanimous decision (UD) with the judges' scorecards reading 97–93, 96–94, and 96–94.

Following an eight-round PTS victory against Arnoldo Solano in June 2019, Gwynne challenged British and Commonwealth lightweight champion Joe Cordina on 31 August at The O2 Arena in London. In a fight which saw both men receive a point deduction for committing fouls, Gwynne suffered the first defeat of his professional career, losing by UD with the judges' scorecards reading 116–110, 116–111, and 116–111.

He bounced back from defeat with a first-round technical knockout (TKO) victory against Abdon Cesar in November 2019, before making a second attempt at the British lightweight title, this time against former world title challenger James Tennyson on 1 August 2020 at Matchroom Sport's headquarters in Brentwood, Essex. Gwynne was hit with a with a two-punch combination in the sixth round, forcing him to go down on one knee. He made it back to his feet before the referee's count of ten, only to be met by a flurry of punches that prompted the referee to call a halt to the contest, awarding Tennyson a TKO victory.

Following his second defeat, Gwynne made a second attempt at the Commonwealth lightweight title, facing Seán McComb on 19 February 2021 at the Bolton Whites Hotel in Bolton. In a fight which saw Gwynne suffer a cut to the back of his head as a result of an accidental elbow strike, he dropped his opponent to the canvas in the sixth round en route to a seventh-round TKO victory after McComb turned his back on Gwynne, prompting the referee to step in and call a halt to the contest.

Gwynne made his first Commonwealth lightweight title defense against Jack O'Keeffe on 27 November 2021, at the LC2 in Swansea, Wales. He retained the title by a wide unanimous decision, with scores of 120–108, 119–109 and 118–110. Gwynne made his second title defense against the unbeaten Luke Willis on 15 April 2022, at the York Hall in Bethnal Green. Aside from being his second title defense, the vacant BBBofC British lightweight title was on the line as well. He won the fight by unanimous decision, with scores of 117–113, 118–110 and 115–112. 
Gavin made his first defence of the British Title against Newport boxer Craig Woodruff trained by Luke Pearce. The bout was declared a draw in Bolton and a rematch was sanctioned by the BBBoC to take place in April, 2023.

Professional boxing record

References

External links

Living people
1990 births
Welsh male boxers
Sportspeople from Merthyr Tydfil
Lightweight boxers
Commonwealth Boxing Council champions